Pachydactylus oreophilus, also known as the Kaokoland rock gecko or African thick-toed gecko, is a species of lizard in the family Gekkonidae. It is found in Namibia and Angola.

References

Pachydactylus
Geckos of Africa
Reptiles of Angola
Reptiles of Namibia
Reptiles described in 1967